Carlos Colón (23 April 1953 – 30 October 2016) was an American poet. He primarily wrote English-language haiku and concrete poems. During his lifetime, he published over 12 chapbooks and over 1,400 poems published in a variety of journals including Modern Haiku and Frogpond.

He later was nicknamed Haiku Elvis due to the Elvis costume he would wear to do public readings of his poetry.

Biography
Colón was born in Shreveport, Louisiana and lived there for most of his life. He earned his bachelor's degree from Louisiana State University Shreveport and a master's degree in library science from Louisiana State University.

He worked as a reference librarian at the Shreveport Memorial Library until his retirement.

He passed away from a heart attack at age 63.

Haiku
The following is a famous haiku of his:

He has written poetry books with Alexis Rotella.

He has written several "visual haiku", sometimes known as "eye-ku". He was a consultant about visual haiku for the book Haiku in English: The First Hundred Years.

His chapbook Mountain Climbing was dedicated to Marlene Mountain, among other authors.

Honors and awards
In Shreveport, a mural called "Let the Good Times Roll" features one of his haiku. Shreveport also had an art project called "Highway Haiku" between 2002 and 2006, where Colón contributed two poems that were featured on billboards in the city. His work has been nominated for a Pushcart Prize.

He is a founding member of the Northwest Louisiana Haiku Society.

His work has been featured in Tazuo Yamaguchi's Haiku: The Art of the Short Poem film.

 Shreveport Regional Arts Council Literature Fellowship, 2002
 Caddo Parish Poet Laureate, 2014

Bibliography

Poetry
 The Worst of Almira Gulch, self-published, 1984
 Blue Jay on a Bowling Pin, self-published, 1991
 Jiminy limericks: A collection of animal poems for children, self-published, 1991
 Mountain Climbing, self-published, 1993
 Clocking Out, self-published, 1996
 Nothing Inside, with Alexis Rotella, proof press, 1996
 Sassy, with Alexis Rotella, 1998
 Circling Bats, with Raffael de Gruttola, 2001
 Wall Street Park, with Raffael de Gruttola, 2007
 Autumn Leaves, with Raffael de Gruttola, 2010
 The Inside Scoop: New and Selected Poems, Naissance, 2010
 Haiku Elvis, Laughing Cactus Press, 2013

See also
 Marlene Mountain
 Alexis Rotella

References

External links
 Remembering Carlos Colón the Haiku Elvis

English-language haiku poets
1953 births
2016 deaths
American male poets
American librarians
Writers from Shreveport, Louisiana